Bloemencorso (a Dutch word) means "flower parade", "flower pageant" or "flower procession". In a parade of this kind the floats (praalwagens), cars and (in some cases) boats are magnificently decorated or covered in flowers. This custom goes back as far as the Middle Ages. Each parade has its own character, charm and theme. Many towns and regions in the Netherlands and Belgium hold parades every year.

Netherlands 
Aalsmeer, Aalsmeerse Bloemencorso (1948-2007)
Beltrum, Bloemencorso Beltrum
Belt-Schutsloot, Gondelvaart Belt-Schutsloot
Drogeham, Gondelvaart op wielen Drogeham 
Duin- en Bollenstreek, Bloemencorso Bollenstreek
Eelde, Bloemencorso Eelde
Elim, Bloemencorso Elim
Frederiksoord, Floraliacorso Frederiksoord
Leersum, Bloemencorso Leersum
Rijnsburg-Katwijk-Noordwijk, Rijnsburgcorso 
Lemelerveld, Bloemencorso Lemelerveld
Lichtenvoorde, Bloemencorso Lichtenvoorde 
Noordwijk-Sassenheim-Lisse-Haarlem, Bloemencorso Bollenstreek
Rekken, Bloemencorso Rekken
Roelofarendsveen, Bloemencorso Roelofarendsveen
Sint Jansklooster, Sint Jansklooster Bloemencorso
Valkenswaard, Bloemencorso Valkenswaard
Vollenhove, Bloemencorso Vollenhove 
Voorthuizen, Bloemencorso Voorthuizen
Winkel, Bloemencorso Winkel 
Westland, Varend Corso Westland
Winterswijk, Bloemencorso Winterswijk
Zundert, Bloemencorso Zundert The largest flower parade in the world.

Belgium 
Blankenberge, Bloemencorso Blankenberge
Hergenrath, Blumenkorso Hergenrath
Loenhout, Bloemencorso Loenhout
Sint-Gillis-bij-Dendermonde, Sint-Gillis-bij-Dendermonde Bloemencorso

Notes

External links 

 Page with comprehensive list of links
 European flower parades

Parades in Belgium
Parades in the Netherlands
Dutch words and phrases
Flower festivals in Belgium
Flower festivals in the Netherlands